Comics have followed different paths of development throughout the world.

Africa
South Africa

Asia
China and Taiwan
Hong Kong
India
Pakistan
Japan (History)
Pakistan (History)
Philippines
South Korea (Webtoon)
Thailand
Vietnam

Europe

Czech
Franco-Belgian (France and Belgium)
Belgium
Manfra
Germany
Hungary
Ireland
Italy
Netherlands
Poland
Portugal
Serbia
Spain
United Kingdom
Northern Ireland
Wales

North America
Canada
Canadian Whites
Québec
Mexico
United States
History
Golden Age
Silver Age
Bronze Age
Modern Age
Puerto Rican comic books

Oceania
Australia

South America
Argentina
Brazil

See also
List of comic books
List of years in comics
Table of years in comics